Clifford Joseph Hill (January 20, 1893 – August 11, 1938) was an American Major League Baseball pitcher. He played for the Philadelphia Athletics during the  season.

References

 SABR biography

1893 births
1938 deaths
Major League Baseball pitchers
Philadelphia Athletics players
Waco Navigators players
Chattanooga Lookouts players
Baltimore Orioles (IL) players
Fort Worth Panthers players
Akron Buckeyes players
Newark Bears (IL) players
Dallas Submarines players
Dallas Steers players
Mount Pleasant Cats players
Baseball players from Texas
People from Marshall, Texas